Stuart Conan Wilson (born 25 December 1946) is an English actor of film, television, and stage who is best known for his villainous and supporting roles in popular films like Lethal Weapon 3, The Age of Innocence, No Escape, Death and the Maiden, The Mask of Zorro, Enemy of the State, and Hot Fuzz.

Early life
Wilson was born in Guildford, Surrey, to an RAF family, and consequently had a varied educational history, spending much of his early childhood in Rhodesia where his father worked as a mining engineer. Having moved to London, he trained at the Royal Academy of Dramatic Art. After leaving RADA he played in theatres during the 1960s and 1970s. He has played major roles with the Royal Shakespeare Company, the Royal Court Theatre, London's West End, regional, touring and many Fringe productions, most particularly at London's Bush Theatre.

Career
Wilson's first break was when he was chosen for the leading role of Johann Strauss II in the 1972 ITV costume drama The Strauss Family. He subsequently made many appearances on British television, his credits including Space: 1999, I, Claudius, Special Branch, The Sweeney, Return of the Saint, The Pallisers, Anna Karenina, The Professionals, Tales of the Unexpected, The Adventures of Sherlock Holmes, The Old Men at the Zoo, The Jewel in the Crown and Prime Suspect. His biggest success was as Alan Stewart in the 1979 thriller serial Running Blind.

Film credits
As a more mature actor, Wilson successfully made the transition to Hollywood, often playing villains. His film credits include Dulcima, Wetherby, Lethal Weapon 3,  No Escape, Enemy of the State, The Rock (uncredited), The Age of Innocence, Teenage Mutant Ninja Turtles III, Death and the Maiden, The Prisoner of Zenda, Slow Burn, The Mask of Zorro and Hot Fuzz. He also starred in television films, such as Secret Weapon, Coins in the Fountain, Her Wicked Ways and Princess of Thieves.

Television work
Wilson made fewer television appearances after his success as a film actor, but continued to appear occasionally in series such as Midsomer Murders (2008), Spooks (2008), and Crossbones.

Filmography

Film

Television

References

External links
 

1946 births
English male film actors
English male stage actors
English male television actors
Royal Shakespeare Company members
Living people
Male actors from Surrey
Actors from Guildford
Alumni of RADA